Vikentij Makušev (1837—1883) was a Russian Slavist and Albanologist. He is best known because of his works about Dubrovnik.

He was born on 10 November 1837 in Brest Litovsk. His father was military engineer. His mother died in 1847 of cholera. In period between 1856 and 1860 he studied at University of Petrograd. In January 1863 Makušev was appointed as Russian consul in Dubrovnik where he spent five years researching archives of Dubrovnik.

Makušev was a professor at University of Warsaw. In Warsaw in 1871 he published his work "Historical researches on the Slavs in Albania in the Middle Ages" in which he presented the result of his research of over three thousand historical documents he studied in archives of Venice, Naples, Palermo, Milan and Ancona. The archival data he collected in archives in Italia is of great importance for the history of south Slavs. Makušev was described as Bulgarophile.

Bibliography

References 

1837 births
1883 deaths
Saint Petersburg State University alumni
University of Warsaw alumni
Albanologists
Slavists